Wikmani poisid may refer to:
 Wikmani poisid (novel), a 1988 novel by Jaan Kross
 Wikmani poisid (TV series), a 1995 TV series, based on the novel